Palaeoniscidae is an extinct family of ray-finned fishes (Actinopterygii) ascribed to the order Palaeonisciformes. The family includes the genus Palaeoniscum and potentially other Palaeozoic and Mesozoic early actinopterygian genera. The name is derived from the Ancient Greek words παλαιός (palaiós, ancient) and ὀνίσκος (oniskos,  'cod-fish' or woodlouse).

Historic background
The family was first named "Palaeoniscini" by Charles Lucien Bonaparte in 1846, and "Palaeonisciden" by Carl Vogt in 1851. Later, the family name was standardized to Palaeoniscidae. The authorship of the family Palaeoniscidae is variably attributed to either Bonaparte or Vogt in the literature. Vogt ascribed the following genera to Palaeoniscidae: Palaeoniscum, Platysomus (misspelled as Platysemius), Amblypterus, Eurynotus, Pygopterus, and Acrolepis. With the exception of Palaeoniscum, these genera were later placed in separate families (Platysomidae, Amblypteridae) or are considered incertae sedis.

Over the years, many other genera of Palaeozoic and Mesozoic early actinopterygians have been referred to Palaeoniscidae due to superficial similarities with the type genus Palaeoniscum from the Guadalupian-Lopingian (middle-late Permian) of Europe. Similarities were noted in their general morphology, such as the bullet shaped head and forward position of the relatively large eyes, the large gape and oblique jaw support, the body being covered with small, rhombic scales that often show peg-and-socket articulation, and the arrangement and structure of the fins, including the heterocercal caudal fin. However, these features are plesiomorphic for actinopterygians. Many taxa ascribed to Palaeoniscidae lack apomorphies that would securely affiliate them with Palaeoniscum. As a result, Palaeoniscidae sensu lato has become a wastebasket taxon (probably paraphyletic). 

In the strict sense, the Palaeoniscidae should only encompass the genus Palaeoniscum and only those genera that are closely related to it. However, due to insufficient knowledge of Palaeoniscum and many other early actinopterygians, and because most of these taxa have never been included in cladistic analyses, it is still uncertain which genera other than Palaeoniscum should be placed in Palaeoniscidae sensu stricto to make this a monophyletic group.

Classification
The following list includes species and genera that have been referred to Palaeoniscidae in the past, usually because of broad resemblance with Palaeoniscum freieslebeni. Many of these taxa are poorly known and have never been analyzed in cladistic studies. Their inclusion in Palaeoniscidae is in most cases doubtful and requires confirmation by cladistic analyses. The listed taxa would imply that the temporal range of the family Palaeoniscidae stretched from the early Permian to the Cretaceous. If only species of Palaeoniscum are included, the temporal range of the family would be restricted to the middle-late Permian.

 Family †Palaeoniscidae Vogt, 1852
 Genus ?†Agecephalichthys Wade, 1935
 Species †Agecephalichthys granulatus Wade, 1935
 Genus ?†Atherstonia Woodward, 1889 [Broometta Chabakov, 1927]
 Species †Atherstonia scutata Woodward, 1889 [Atherstonia cairncrossi Broom, 1913; Amblypterus capensis Broom, 1913; Broometta cairncrossi Chabakov, 1927]
 Species †Atherstonia minor Woodward, 1893
 Genus ?†Cryphaeiolepis Traquair, 1881
 Species †Cryphaeiolepis scutata Traquair, 1881
 Genus ?†Cteniolepidotrichia Poplin & Su, 1992
 Species †Cteniolepidotrichia turfanensis Poplin & Su, 1992
 Genus †Dicellopyge Brough, 1931
 Species †Dicellopyge macrodentata Brough, 1931
 Species †Dicellopyge lissocephalus Brough, 1931
 Genus ?†Duwaichthys Liu et al., 1990
 Species †Duwaichthys mirabilis Liu et al., 1990
 Genus ?†Ferganiscus Sytchevskaya & Yakolev, 1999
 Species †Ferganiscus osteolepis Sytchevskaya & Yakolev, 1999
 Genus †Gyrolepis Agassiz, 1833 non Kade, 1858
 Species †G. albertii Agassiz, 1833
 Species †G. gigantea Agassiz, 1833
 Species †G. maxima Agassiz, 1833
 Species †G. quenstedti Dames, 1888
 Species †G. tenuistriata Agassiz, 1833
 Genus †Gyrolepidoides Cabrera, 1944
 Species †G. creyanus Schaeffer, 1955
 Species †G. cuyanus Cabrera, 1944
 Species †G. multistriatus Rusconi, 1948
 Genus ?†Palaeoniscinotus Rohon, 1890
 Species †P. czekanowskii Rohon, 1890
 Genus †Palaeoniscum de Blainville, 1818  [Palaeoniscus Agassiz, 1833 non Von Meyer, 1858; Palaeoniscas Rzchak, 1881; Eupalaeoniscus Rzchak, 1881; Palaeomyzon Weigelt, 1930; Geomichthys Sauvage, 1888]
 Species †P. angustum (Rzehak, 1881) [Palaeoniscas angustus Rzehak, 1881]
 Species †P. antipodeum (Egerton, 1864) [Palaeoniscus antipodeus Egerton, 1864]
 Species †P. antiquum Williams, 1886
 Species †P. arenaceum Berger, 1832
 Species †P. capense (Bloom, 1913) [Palaeoniscus capensis Bloom, 1913]
 Species †P. comtum (Agassiz, 1833) [Palaeoniscus comtus Agassiz, 1833]
 Species †P. daedalium Yankevich & Minich, 1998
 Species †P. devonicum Clarke, 1885
 Species †P. elegans (Sedgwick, 1829) [Palaeoniscus elegans Sedgwick, 1829]
 Species †P. freieslebeni de Blainville, 1818 [Eupalaeoniscus freieslebeni (de Brainville, 1818); Palaeoniscus freieslebeni (de Brainville, 1818)]
 Species †P. hassiae (Jaekel, 1898) [Galeocerdo contortus hassiae Jaekel, 1898; Palaeomyzon hassiae (Jaekel, 1898)]
 Species †P. kasanense Geinitz & Vetter, 1880
 Species †P. katholitzkianum (Rzehak, 1881) [Palaeoniscas katholitzkianus Rzehak, 1881]
 Species †P. landrioti (le Sauvage, 1890) [Palaeoniscus landrioti le Sauvage, 1890]
 Species †P. longissimum (Agassiz, 1833) [Palaeoniscus longissimus Agassiz, 1833]
 Species †P. macrophthalmum (McCoy, 1855) [Palaeoniscus macrophthalmus McCoy, 1855]
 Species †P. magnum (Woodward, 1937) [Palaeoniscus magnus Woodward, 1937]
 Species †P. moravicum (Rzehak, 1881) [Palaeoniscas moravicus Rzehak, 1881]
 Species †P. promtu (Rzehak, 1881) [Palaeoniscas promtus Rzehak, 1881]
 Species †P. reticulatum Williams, 1886
 Species †P. scutigerum Newberry, 1868
 Species †P. vratislavensis (Agassiz, 1833) [Palaeoniscus vratislavensis Agassiz, 1833]
 Genus †Palaeothrissum de Blainville, 1818
 Species †P. elegans Sedgwick, 1829
 Species †P. macrocephalum de Blainville, 1818
 Species †P. magnum de Blainville, 1818
 Genus ?†Shuniscus Su, 1983
 Species †Shuniscus longianalis Su, 1983
 Genus ?†Suchonichthys Minich, 2001
 Species †Suchonichthys molini Minich, 2001
 Genus ?†Trachelacanthus Fischer De Waldheim, 1850
 Species †Trachelacanthus stschurovskii Fischer De Waldheim, 1850
 Genus ?†Triassodus Su, 1984
 Species †Triassodus yanchangensis Su, 1984
 Genus ?†Turfania Liu & Martínez, 1973
 Species †T. taoshuyuanensis Liu & Martínez, 1973
 Species †T. varta Wang, 1979
 Genus ?†Turgoniscus Jakovlev, 1968
 Species †Turgoniscus reissi Jakovlev, 1968
 Genus ?†Weixiniscus Su & Dezao, 1994
 Species †Weixiniscus microlepis Su & Dezao, 1994
 Genus ?†Xingshikous Liu, 1988
 Species †Xingshikous xishanensis Liu, 1988
 Genus ?†Yaomoshania Poplin et al., 1991
 Species †Yaomoshania minutosquama Poplin et al., 1991

References

Palaeonisciformes
Prehistoric ray-finned fish families
Silurian first appearances
Cretaceous extinctions